Khalid Ismael Ali Baba (born 6 September 1996) is a Bahraini swimmer. 

He appeared in the 2012 Summer Olympics in London, as part of Bahrain's Olympic team.  He participated in the men's 100m butterfly event where he recorded a time of  1:04.05, which beat his previous personal best of 1:05.09.

References

Swimmers at the 2012 Summer Olympics
Olympic swimmers of Bahrain
Bahraini male swimmers
Living people
1996 births
Sportspeople from Manama
20th-century Bahraini people
21st-century Bahraini people